Swish is a US English slang term for effeminate behavior and interests (camp), emphasized and sanctioned in gay male communities prior to the Stonewall riots. This behaviour is also described as being nelly in British English, and both terms are often considered to be derogatory.

Being swish stereotypically includes a "sashaying" walk, and the use of falsetto voices, feminine pronouns, and superlatives. According to Martin Levine and Michael Kimmel in Gay Macho: The Life and Death of the Homosexual Clone:

Status after the Stonewall riots
Although being butch was viewed as deviant and socially unacceptable by gay male society, being swish has since lost its mainstream gay status post-Stonewall, and in addition to being used occasionally by mainstream culture is now most often derogatory even when used by gay men. Though it may be assumed that most post-Stonewall gay men view acting swish as internalized homophobia, a concession to stereotypes of gay men as less than manly. However, the Castro clone, a hyper-masculine, macho standard and ideal behaviour that replaced swish, adapted many camp elements such as dishing (gossip).

Thus while clones could view swish as embodying anti-gay stereotypes, being swish was a way of indicating and performing one's identity, indicating that anti-gay stereotypes could be derived from gay identities. Further, one could turn swish on or off, as described in Gay Macho: The Life and Death of the Homosexual Clone:

Modern LGBT rights movement
Most recently, Swish has taken on an empowering and action-oriented meaning within the LGBT rights movement, in part thanks to an organization by the same name. From this point of view, to swish indicates a form of activism that is uplifting, rewarding and fun, and creates opportunities for straight allies to become active in the LGBT civil rights movement.

See also

 Polari

References

Further reading
 Swish: My Quest to Become the Gayest Person Ever by Joel Derfner, Broadway Books, 2008.

Gay culture
Gay effeminacy
Gender roles in the LGBT community
Stereotypes of LGBT people
LGBT slang
Male homosexuality